

Players

Competitions

League Two

League table

Results summary

League position by match

Matches

Play-offs

FA Cup

Carling Cup

LDV Vans Trophy

Appearances, goals and cards

Northampton Town F.C. seasons
Northampton Town